Aber is  a German-originated name that can be a surname or a given name. Notable people with the name include:
Aber Whitcomb (born 1977), American CTO and co-founder of MySpace
Al Aber (1927–1993), left-handed Major League Baseball pitcher
Maribel Aber, American business journalist

See also 
Aber (disambiguation)